Benjamin Siegert (born 7 July 1981) is a German former professional footballer who played as a midfielder.

Career
Siegert was born in Berlin. He made his debut on the professional league level in the Bundesliga for VfL Wolfsburg on 12 May 2001 when he came on as a substitute for Patrick Weiser in the 83rd minute in a game against Eintracht Frankfurt.

On 5 October 2007, he scored the fastest goal in the history of German professional football. He scored for SV Wehen Wiesbaden in the 8th second of the game against Greuther Fürth. On 26 June 2009, he left Wehen Wiesbaden and signed for VfL Osnabrück, where he spent two years before signing for Preußen Münster.

References

External links
 
 

1981 births
Living people
Association football midfielders
Footballers from Berlin
German footballers
VfL Wolfsburg players
VfL Wolfsburg II players
Eintracht Braunschweig players
SV Wehen Wiesbaden players
VfL Osnabrück players
SC Preußen Münster players
Sportfreunde Lotte players
Tennis Borussia Berlin players
Bundesliga players
2. Bundesliga players
3. Liga players